Hundreds and thousands is an idiomatic expression used to mean "an indefinite but emphatically large number". Although similar to and sometimes regarded as an error for "hundreds of thousands", it is in fact not so definitely large.

It is also (used as a plurale tantum noun) a kind of decorative confectionery consisting of tiny coloured beads of sugar, commonly used in the United Kingdom, Australia and New Zealand. Similar confections include:

Sprinkles
Nonpareils
Muisjes

See also
100000 (number), one hundred thousand
Hundreds & Thousands, 1985 album by Bronski Beat
Indefinite and fictitious numbers
Fairy bread